Ben Caldwell may refer to:

Ben Caldwell (cartoonist) (born 1973), American cartoonist
Ben Caldwell (filmmaker) (born 1945), American arts educator and filmmaker
Ben F. Caldwell (1848–1924), U.S. Representative from Illinois

See also
Benjamin Caldwell (1739–1820), Royal Navy Officer
Benjamin Rollins Caldwell (born 1983), American artist